Pancho Villa (1878–1923) was a Mexican revolutionary general.

Pancho Villa may also refer to:

People 

 Pancho Villa (boxer) (1901–1925), a Filipino professional boxer

Places 

 Pancho Villa State Park, a National Historic Landmark District

Arts, media, & entertainment 

 Pancho Villa (film), a 1972 spaghetti western film directed by Eugenio Martin

Other uses 

 Pancho Villa Expedition, a U.S. military operation during the Mexican Revolution
 Pancho Villa (restaurant), a Finland-based Tex Mex restaurant